Musa jackeyi (commonly called the Johnstone River banana) is a species of wild banana (genus Musa) in the Banana Family (Musaceae).. It is placed in section Callimusa (now including the former section Australimusa). It has only a small native range in north-east Queensland, Australia. It resembles the cultivated bananas called "fe'i" or "fehi", having an upright rather than a drooping fruit stalk, with the green terminal bud pointing upwards, and sap which is reddish in colour.

References

jackeyi
Plants described in 1874
Flora of Queensland